"The Waking" is a poem written by Theodore Roethke in 1953 in the form of a villanelle. It comments on the unknowable with a contemplative tone. It also has been interpreted as comparing life to waking and death to sleeping.

In popular culture
The poem appears as an object in Kurt Vonnegut's novel Slaughterhouse-Five.
An excerpt of the poem also appears at the beginning of Dean Koontz's novel Odd Hours.
Kurt Elling sings the poem on his 2007 album Nightmoves.
Quoted by the psycho cop in Stephen King's novel Desperation.

References

External links 
 Source text
 Secondary source of the text

American poems
1953 poems